Ludvig Carlius (born 14 March 2001) is a Swedish football midfielder who plays for Mjällby AIF.

References

2001 births
Living people
Swedish footballers
Association football midfielders
Helsingborgs IF players
Mjällby AIF players
Allsvenskan players
IFK Malmö Fotboll players
Ettan Fotboll players